Dario Dabac (born 23 May 1978) is a Croatian retired footballer and manager.

Club statistics

References

External links

1978 births
Living people
People from Senj
Association football fullbacks
Croatian footballers
NK Zagreb players
Dynamo Dresden players
1. FC Union Berlin players
SpVgg Greuther Fürth players
SV Ried players
Sanfrecce Hiroshima players
HNK Rijeka players
Al-Arabi SC (Kuwait) players
NK Nehaj players
Chongqing Liangjiang Athletic F.C. players
Shenyang Zhongze F.C. players
Croatian Football League players
Oberliga (football) players
Regionalliga players
2. Bundesliga players
Austrian Football Bundesliga players
J1 League players
J2 League players
Kuwait Premier League players
First Football League (Croatia) players
China League One players
Croatian expatriate footballers
Expatriate footballers in Germany
Expatriate footballers in Austria
Expatriate footballers in Japan
Expatriate footballers in Kuwait
Expatriate footballers in China
Croatian expatriate sportspeople in Germany
Croatian expatriate sportspeople in Austria
Croatian expatriate sportspeople in Japan
Croatian expatriate sportspeople in Kuwait
Croatian expatriate sportspeople in China
Croatian football managers
Sichuan Jiuniu F.C. managers
Croatian expatriate football managers
Expatriate football managers in China
HNK Rijeka non-playing staff